Choi Jae-hyun, better known as huhi, is a South Korean professional League of Legends player for Golden Guardians of the LCS.

Career 
Huhi joined his first major team in North America when he became a member of Counter Logic Gaming in 2015. As CLG's mid laner, Huhi and his teammates won the 2016 NA LCS Spring Split Finals against Team SoloMid. He went on to place second at the 2016 Mid-Season Invitational. In November 2018, Huhi left CLG to play for 100 Thieves in the 2019 LCS Spring Split, but was released following the end of the regular season. Huhi played as a support for the Golden Guardians' academy team, which he joined before the start of the 2019 Summer Split. On July 5, 2019, he was promoted to the Golden Guardians' main roster, along with his AD carry, Victor "FBI" Huang.

100 Thieves announced on November 19, 2020, that it had acquired Huhi and Damonte from the Golden Guardians.

Tournament results

Counter Logic Gaming 
 1st — 2016 NA LCS Spring Split Finals
 2nd — 2016 Mid-Season Invitational
 4th — 2016 NA LCS Summer regular season
 4th — 2016 NA LCS Summer playoffs

100 Thieves 
 4th - 2021 NA LCS Spring 
 1st - 2021 NA LCS Summer Split Finals

References 

League of Legends mid lane players
100 Thieves players
Counter Logic Gaming players
Golden Guardians players
South Korean esports players
South Korean expatriates in the United States
Living people
Year of birth missing (living people)